The Universe Versus Alex Woods (2013) is the debut novel by Gavin Extence. The book was described by Emma John in The Guardian as being "the everyday tale of a teenage science nerd hit by a meteorite who strikes up a friendship with a pot-smoking Vietnam veteran. And may or may not be involved in his death." The book has been compared to The Curious Incident of the Dog in the Night-Time, as well as the writing of Kurt Vonnegut. The book won the Waterstones Eleven award, and was nominated for the National Book Awards.

External links

References

2013 British novels
2013 debut novels
Hodder & Stoughton books